Tamparuli is a small town and a sub-district of Tuaran on the west coast of Sabah, Malaysia. It is populated mainly by native Dusuns, while a sizeable Chinese community (of whom most are Hakkas) runs most of the shops in the town proper. As with many other small towns in Sabah and indeed Malaysia as a whole, the town itself consists of both newer concrete shoplots as well as old wooden ones, which are particularly prone to destruction by fire as evidenced in the destruction of one of the wooden shoplots in recent years. Now, Tamparuli is said to have the potential to grow with the convenience of a new shop site called Tamparuli Point.

The most famous landmark in Tamparuli is a long hanging bridge which is immortalized in the song Jambatan Tamparuli, a popular Kadazan-Dusun song. Another bridge, built for motor traffic, spans the river far below the hanging bridge and is frequently flooded during heavy rain. The beginning lyric below is a Tamparuli Bridge song.

Pak pak kang ku doh (Pak pak I stepped),

Sumunsui doh jambatan (following/crossing the bridge),

Jambatan doh Tamparuli (The Tamparuli Bridge),

Bakasut tinggi oku (I wear high heels),

*Pak pak called 'pok pok', refers to the sound of shoes/feet, and in this song is the sound of high heels

Tamparuli is located just off the Kota Kinabalu - Sandakan road, making it a stop for a snack or meal for travelers taking this route from the direction of Kota Kinabalu. The town is also a stop en route to the town of Kiulu, a whitewater rafting destination for domestic and foreign tourists.

Etymology 
The origin of the name 'Tamparuli' has different versions of many people's stories over the years. The most popular original version was the town of Tamparuli named after a suspension bridge built by an unnamed British officer. A temporary suspension bridge was built to replace the old suspension bridge that had been damaged by the flood. According to community stories, the British officer turned to the locals and said 'this bridge is temporary'. Thus, the word (Temporary) is gradually used until it is called Tamparuli.

Others version from the year 1942 until the year 1944, the Tamparuli area was used by the Japanese military as a base for heavy vehicles such as trucks. Then, the local people called that area are known as 'Tempat Lori' means truck place and, eventually, it turned called Tamparuli. Next, according to another source, the Tamparuli town also derives a name from words know as slapped by water and, this name derives from Brunei's word, due Brunei traders who came to Tamparuli had trouble to get up to the upstream because of the high water flow.

History

Origins of Tamparuli town 
Tamparuli town known was as called "Bontoi" (actually referring to a small village in that area) and, "Bontoi" of village name means a bridge believed to have existed for over 200 years long before it was named Tamparuli. From a small village, Tamparuli later evolved into a town. The change came after several outside traders, especially among Chinese people from Tuaran, set up some lumber shops in the 1930s.

Memorial Monuments 

There is a monument believed to be over 60 years old built near the market in Tamparuli town. According to historical sources, the purpose of the monument was to commemorate two British soldiers who died in a nearby river during a Land Rover four-wheel drive that they crossed across the Tamparuli bridge on May 18, 1960. The dead British soldier named JWN Hall of the Royal Health Corps and a driver, DC Cooper of the Royal Service Corps based at Paradise Camp, Kota Belud. The unfortunate tragedy occurred when two soldiers were on their way to send a severely injured woman from Kampung Sayap, Kota Belud to a hospital in Jesselton. At that time, the vehicle was in the middle of a bridge and an unexpected stream of currents had occurred causing the vehicle to drift. The bodies of the three victims were found with two still in the four-wheel-drive Land Rover that was swept away by the current. Three days later, two British soldiers were buried in the army cemetery at Paradise Camp in Kota Belud. The monument is also one of the visitors' places of interest in the town of Tamparuli.

Disaster

Flood 
The floods have a historical record in the area town of Tamparuli that reminds people until today, the floods also have impacted other areas such as Tuaran, Tenghilan and, other districts in Sabah. In the year 1999, the area Tamparuli town was hit by a massive flood at that time and bring destroyed convenience such as the Tamparuli old bridge. Flooding also occurred in the year 1992 in area Tamparuli town.

Next, the floods also occurred in the year 1996 due to Ribut Tropika Greg (1996 Pacific typhoon season) that hit the entire state of Sabah. The Tuaran district affected, where the road links between Tuaran and Kota Kinabalu as a result of the falling tree, as well as the lack of electricity throughout the area due to broken cables or broken electrical poles. Thus, this has made the government and the private sector unable to function and, water supply is also a problem. In the area town of Tamparuli, SK Saradan, SK Pekan Tamparuli, SK Rungus, SK Lingga Baru, SK Guakon and, SMK Tamparuli were the schools that reported the case.

On the 15th of January 2014, the Tamparuli town area was hit by landslides and floods. The rain that non-stop causes several areas hit by flooding and, the landslide occurred in the village of Rangalau Baru. The severe flooding caused several vehicles to be stranded and unable to get out of the area. Now, the success of 20 students from SMK Tamparuli, created a flood warning system installed on the Tamparuli Old Bridge here, benefiting more than 12,000 locals. Thus, this system can help to enhance the safety and give information about the flood to the community.

Geography 
Position of Tamparuli Town near other areas;

At , and 36 Kilometers from Northwest of Kota Kinabalu city,  Tuaran district include Tamparuli area stands about 1200 until 2500 meters above sea level.

Tourist Attractions 

The 'Upside Down House' or Rumah Terbalik is a tourist attraction located in the town. It is the only structure of such type known to exist in Malaysia so far and a guided tour is available for visitors at daytime.

The hanging bridge is known as Jambatan Tamparuli is a attraction for a photo-stop at the town. The bridge became well known after a song named after the bridge was sung by local singer Justin Lusah. Moreover, visitors who came to Jambatan Tamparuli also be welcomed by the traditional Dusun folk music and dance performances at the foot of the Jambatan Tamparuli. The festival music group consists of five to 13 players, including musical instruments such as Marimba, Togunggak, Sompoton, Suling, Skopion and, Sompoton Kembar.

Chanteek Borneo Indigenous Museum is a mini-museum exhibiting miniature dolls in Barbie size, all dressed in Malaysian's costume. There are about 300 miniature costumes being exhibited with 2/3 of the costumes are from Sabah. The museum is open for the visitor on a daily day.

JonGrapevines & Figs Garden is also a tourist attraction and located in Kampong Bantayan, Tamparuli. This place shows various types of grapes and figs.

The Ruhiang hill, known as 'Bukit Perahu' (St. Veronica Hill), is a place for activity of hiking and is located near Tamparuli Town. Next, Kusai hill is also one of the main attractions for visitors for activities of hiking and tracks for bicycle riders. Furthermore, Murug-Turug eco-tourism, hiking & jungle trekking (MTET) is one of the tourist attractions for outdoor activities located in the Kampong Minangkob, 11 kilometers from Tamparuli Town and, 45 kilometers from Kota Kinabalu city.

Facilities 

Tamparuli town also has facilities such as the jogging track was built near the banks of the Tamparuli River for the community to conduct leisure activities with a distance of approximately 1 kilometers. A freshwater fish statue near with jogging track is used as a symbol of the Tagal area since the year 2011. The freshwater fish statue was created approximately three-meters using a concrete and placed on top of a five-meters of a concrete pillar, surrounded by benches for visitors to relax. Moreover, this facility of the jogging track provided nearest with a small canteen and hut.
According to Datuk Jahid Jahim, it hopes to install lights along the jogging track.

Culture 
Tamu Tamparuli has long existed in the year 1974 ago and every Wednesday morning, 'Tamu' (native open-air market) is held in Tamparuli town. At the Tamu, produce, seafood, traditional food and drinks, handicrafts and other goods from Tamparuli and the surrounding villages are bought and sold.

References

External links 

Towns in Sabah